Sri Lanka is a tropical island situated close to the southern tip of India. The invertebrate fauna is as large as it is common to other regions of the world. There are about 2 million species of arthropods found in the world, and still it is counting. So many new species are discover up to this time also. So it is very complicated and difficult to summarize the exact number of species found within a certain region.

The following is an incomplete list of the moths of Sri Lanka.

Moth
Moths are lepidopterans that classified together with their beautiful partners, the butterflies. The two types are easily recognized by first sight with a good naked eye. The main differences are as follows.

Within Sri Lanka, the latest revision of lepidopterans described 1903 species with 58 families of butterflies and moths. Out of these 1903 species, 208 species are butterflies and 1695 species are moths.

The family-wise number of moth species are:

Checklist of species

Alucitidae
Alucita ischalea  
Alucita mesolychna  
Alucita microscopica 
Alucita montigena 
Alucita niphostrota 
Alucita postfasciata 
Alucita sycophanta 
Alucita thapsina 
Alucita toxophila 
Alucita trachyptera 
Triscaedecia dactyloptera

Autostichidae 
Encrasima elaeopis 
Encrasima reversa 
Encrasima xanthoclista 
Nephantis serinopa 
Oegoconia praeramis 
Stereosticha pilulata

Batrachedridae
Batrachedra arenosella 
Batrachedra aphypnota 
Batrachedra macroloncha 
Batrachedra scapulata 
Batrachedra substrata 
Batrachedra verax

Bombycidae
Gunda ochracea 
Gunda thwaitesii 
Trilocha varians

Brachodidae - little bear moths
Nigilgia adjectella 
Nigilgia anactis 
Phycodes chionardis 
Phycodes minor 
Phycodes radiata 
Phycodes taonopa

Callidulidae - day-flying moths
Tetragonus catamitus

Carposinidae 
Paramorpha aulata 
Nosphidia paradoxa 
Metacosmesis aelinopa 
Metacosmesis laxeuta

Choreutidae - metalmark moths

Brenthia buthusalis 
Brenthia catenata 
Brenthia cyanaula 
Brenthia entoma 
Brenthia thoracosema 
Choreutis achyrodes 
Choreutis euclista 
Choreutis ialeura 
Choreutis orthogona 
Choreutis ophiosema 
Choreutis psilachyra 
Choreutis sexfasciella 
Choreutis taprobanes 
Prochoreutis sehestediana 
Saptha smaragditis

Coleophoridae
Coleophora crypsiphanes

Copromorphidae
 Copromorpha pleurophanes

Cosmopterigidae - cosmet moths

Allotalanta globulosa 
Anatrachyntis amphisaris 
Anatrachyntis centrophanes 
Anatrachyntis falcatella 
Anatrachyntis mythologica 
Archisopha foliosa 
Ascalenia thoracista 
Cosmopterix aculeata 
Cosmopterix artifica 
Cosmopterix basilisca 
Cosmopterix catharacma 
Cosmopterix hamifera 
Cosmopterix panopla 
Cosmopterix spiculata 
Cyphothyris ophryodes 
Homosaces anthocoma 
Isorrhoa triloxias 
Labdia arachnitis 
Labdia faceta 
Labdia oxychlora 
Labdia semicoccinea 
Limnaecia chromaturga 
Limnaecia magica 
Limnaecia scaeosema 
Meleonoma heterota 
Meleonoma petrota 
Meleonoma stomota 
Pyroderces anthinopa 
Syntomaula tephrota 
Trissodoris honorariella

Cossidae - carpenter millers

Azygophleps scalaris 
Duomitus ceramicus 
Indarbela quadrinotata 
Isocossus vandeldeni 
Neurozerra roricyanea 
Orientozeuzera postexcisa 
Phragmataecia castaneae 
Phragmataecia impura 
Phragmataecia parvipuncta 
Polyphagozerra coffeae 
Rugigegat nigra 
Xyleutes persona 
Zeuzera pyrina

Crambidae 
Hemiscopis suffusalis 
Hydrorybina polusalis

Acentropinae

Agassiziella alicialis 
Agassiziella angulipennis 
Agassiziella dianale 
Agassiziella fuscifusalis 
Agassiziella niveinotatum 
Agassiziella picalis 
Ambia iambealis 
Ambia tenebrosalis 
Ambia xantholeuca 
Cataclysta angulata 
Dodanga cristata 
Elophila melagynalis 
Elophila responsalis 
Eoophyla sejunctalis 
Eristena ornata 
Eristena postalbalis 
Eristena araealis 
Eristena pulchellale 
Eristena melanotalis 
Eristena fumibasale 
Nymphicula blandialis 
Nymphicula nigritalis 
Nymphula grisealis 
Opisthedeicta poritialis 
Paracataclysta fuscalis 
Parapoynx crisonalis 
Parapoynx fluctuosalis 
Parapoynx votalis 
Parapoynx stagnalis = Nymphula depunctalis 
Symphonia multipictalis

Crambinae

Ancylolomia argentata 
Ancylolomia bitubirosella 
Ancylolomia cervicella 
Ancylolomia chrysographellus 
Ancylolomia indica 
Ancylolomia locupletellus 
Ancylolomia shefferialis 
Ancylolomia simplella 
Ancylolomia taprobanensis 
Ancylolomia westwoodi 
Angustalius malacelloides 
Argyria plumbolinealis 
Arthroschista hilaralis 
Calamotropha anticella 
Calamotropha argenticilia 
Calamotropha atkinsoni 
Calamotropha caesella 
Calamotropha delatalis 
Calamotropha endopolia 
Calamotropha indica 
Calamotropha melanosticta 
Calamotropha melli 
Calamotropha neurigrammalis 
Calamotropha oculalis 
Calamotropha pseudodielota 
Calamotropha punctivenellus 
Calamotropha schwarzi 
Charltona desistalis 
Charltona fusca 
Charltona kala 
Charltoniada apicella 
Chilo auricilius 
Chilo ceylonica 
Chilo partellus 
Chilo suppressalis 
Crambus dianiphalis 
Culladia admigratella 
Eschata xanthocera 
Eschata xanthorhyncha 
Gargela renatusalis 
Glaucocharis incisella 
Glaucocharis minutalis 
Glaucocharis ochrophanes 
Haimbachia flavalis 
Haimbachia lunilinealis 
Haimbachia strigulalis 
Leucoides fuscicostalis 
Mesolia margistrigella 
Mesolia pandavella 
Pediasia ochristrigella 
Pilocrocis milvinalis 
Prionapteryx scitulellus 
Pseudocatharylla duplicellus 
Ptychopseustis argentisparsalis 
Ptychopseustis fuscivenalis 
Ptychopseustis plumbeolinealis 
Roxita adspersella 
Surattha invectalis 
Surattha nigrifascialis 
Thopeutis galleriellus

Cybalomiinae
Hendecasis duplifascialis 
Ptychopseustis argentisparsalis 
Ptychopseustis fuscivenalis 
Trichophysetis nigricincta

Epipaschiinae 
Lepidogma melanolopha 
Macalla nubilalis 
Orthaga euadrusalis 
Salma validalis 
Teliphasa nubilosa 
Termioptycha albifurcalis 
Termioptycha margarita

Evergestinae
Crocidolomia suffusalis 
Crocidolomia pavonana

Musotiminae
Drosophantis caerulata

Noordinae
Noorda blitealis

Odontiinae
Heortia vitessoides

Pyraustinae

Achyra coelatalis 
Achyra nudalis 
Anania obliquata 
Daulia argyrophoralis 
Euclasta defamatalis 
Euclasta filigeralis 
Glauconoe deductalis 
Hodebertia testalis 
Hyalobathra illectalis 
Hyalobathra undulinea 
Isocentris filalis 
Mabra eryxalis 
Massepha absolutalis 
Nevrina procopia 
Paliga celatalis 
Paliga machoeralis 
Symmoracma minoralis

Schoenobiinae

Catagela adjurella 
Donacaula dodatellus 
Patissa curvilinealis 
Patissa erythrozonalis 
Patissa lactealis 
Patissa virginea 
Ramila acciusalis 
Ramila ruficostalis 
Schoenobius immeritalis 
Scirpophaga fusciflua 
Scirpophaga incertulas 
Scirpophaga nivella 
Scirpophaga whalleyi 
Scirpophaga xanthogastrella

Scopariinae
Scoparia albifusalis 
Scoparia congestalis 
Scoparia murificalis

Spilomelinae - spilomeline moths

Aethaloessa calidalis 
Agathodes ostentalis 
Agrioglypta eurytusalis 
Agrioglypta excelsalis 
Agrotera basinotata 
Agrotera barcealis 
Agrotera effertalis 
Agrotera scissalis 
Analyta apicalis 
Archernis capitalis 
Ategumia adipalis 
Bocchoris acamasalis 
Bocchoris inspersalis 
Bocchoris tenera 
Bocchoris trivitralis 
Botyodes asialis 
Bradina adhaesalis 
Bradina admixtalis 
Chalcidoptera emissalis 
Cirrhochrista bracteolalis 
Cirrhochrista pulchellalis 
Cnaphalocrocis medinalis 
Cnaphalocrocis patnalis 
Conogethes punctiferalis 
Cotachena histricalis 
Cydalima laticostalis 
Diaphania glauculalis 
Diaphania indica 
Diathrausta profundalis 
Dysallacta negatalis 
Eurrhyparodes bracteolalis 
Eurrhyparodes tricoloralis 
Glycythyma chrysorycta 
Glyphodes actorionalis 
Glyphodes bicolor 
Glyphodes bivitralis 
Glyphodes caesalis 
Glyphodes canthusalis 
Glyphodes onychinalis 
Glyphodes pyloalis 
Glyphodes stolalis 
Haritalodes derogata 
Herpetogramma basalis 
Herpetogramma cynaralis 
Herpetogramma hipponalis 
Herpetogramma licarsisalis 
Herpetogramma phaeopteralis 
Hydriris ornatalis 
Hymenia perspectalis 
Ischnurges gratiosalis 
Lamprosema commixta 
Lamprosema fuscifimbrialis 
Leucinodes orbonalis 
Lygropia distorta 
Maruca vitrata 
Metasia tiasalis 
Metoeca foedalis 
Mimudea brevialis 
Nacoleia charesalis 
Nausinoe geometralis 
Nausinoe perspectata 
Nistra coelatalis 
Omiodes diemenalis 
Omiodes indicata 
Omiodes surrectalis 
Omphisa anastomosalis 
Omphisa illisalis 
Pagyda botydalis 
Pagyda salvalis 
Palpita annulata 
Palpita nigropunctalis 
Pardomima amyntusalis 
Parotis marinata 
Patania balteata 
Patania deficiens 
Patania iopasalis 
Patania sabinusalis 
Patania ultimalis 
Phostria obscurata 
Poliobotys ablactalis 
Polygrammodes sabelialis 
Polythlipta divaricata 
Pramadea crotonalis 
Pramadea lunalis 
Prophantis octoguttalis 
Psara admensalis 
Pycnarmon meritalis 
Pycnarmon virgatalis 
Pygospila tyres 
Rehimena phrynealis 
Rehimena surusalis 
Rhimphaliodes macrostigma 
Sameodes cancellalis 
Spoladea recurvalis 
Stemorrhages marthesiusalis 
Stemorrhages oceanitis 
Sufetula nitidalis 
Sufetula rectifascialis 
Sufetula sunidesalis 
Syllepte chalybifascia 
Synclera danalis 
Synclera rotundalis 
Synclera traducalis 
Synclera univocalis 
Syngamia falsidicalis 
Syngamia latimarginalis 
Tatobotys biannulalis 
Tatobotys janapalis 
Tinerastia discipunctella 
Tinerastia fissirella 
Terastia meticulosalis 
Terastia subjectalis 
Udea flavofimbriata 
Udea ferrugalis

Wurthiinae
Niphopyralis albida 
Niphopyralis contaminata 
Niphopyralis nivalis

Drepanidae - hooktip and false owlet moths

Amphitorna albipuncta 
Callidrepana patrana 
Canucha specularis 
Drapetodes fratercula 
Oreta extensa 
Phalacra vidhisaria 
Teldenia alba 
Tridrepana acuta 
Tridrepana albonotata

Depressariidae
Odites paracyrta 
Odites psilotis

Dudgeoneidae
Dudgeonea leucosticta

Elachistidae - grass-miner moths

Acria emarginella 
Acria obtusella 
Cryptolechia aganopis 
Cryptolechia chrysocoma 
Cryptolechia micracma 
Cryptolechia orthotoma 
Cryptolechia tetraspilella 
Elachista brachyplectra 
Ethmia hilarella

Epipyropidae - planthopper parasite moths
Epipyrops pallidipuncta 
Epipyrops poligrapha 
Epiricania melanoleuca

Erebidae - underwing moths

Aganainae

Asota caricae 
Asota ficus 
Asota plaginota 
Asota plana 
Asota producta 
Digama fasciata 
Digama hearseyana 
Digama insulana

Anobinae - anobine moths
Anoba sinuata

Arctiinae - tiger and lichen moths

Aemene taprobanis 
Aloa lactinea 
Alytarchia leonina 
Amata albapex 
Amata cyssea 
Amata passalis 
Amata thoracica 
Amerila astreus 
Amerila eugenia 
Argina astrea 
Asura arcuata 
Asura hilaris 
Asura ila 
Asura floccosa 
Asura metamelas 
Asura rubricosa 
Asura ruptifascia 
Asura semifascia 
Asura solita 
Asura uniformis 
Asura varians 
Barsine cuneonotata 
Barsine defecta 
Brunia antica 
Ceryx diptera 
Chamaita nympha 
Creatonotos gangis 
Creatonotos interrupta 
Curoba sangarida 
Cyana detrita 
Cyana peregrina 
Cyana puella 
Cyana subornata 
Cyclosiella dulcicula 
Diduga albicosta 
Diduga flavicostata 
Dolgoma angulifera 
Dolgoma oblitterans 
Eilema fuscipes 
Eilema fasciata 
Eilema intermixta 
Eilema punctifera 
Eressa confinis 
Eressa subaurata 
Eressa vespa 
Euchromia magna 
Euchromia polymena 
Eugoa bipunctata 
Eugoa bipuncta 
Eugoa trifasciella 
Eurosia grisea 
Eurosia trimaculata 
Gampola fasciata 
Garudinia latana 
Hemonia orbiferana 
Holocraspedon nigropunctum 
Lemyra subfascia 
Machairophora fulvipuncta 
Mangina argus 
Mangina syringa 
Micraloa lineola 
Micraloa emittens 
Migoplastis correcta 
Migoplastis alba 
Miltochrista gratiosa 
Mithuna fuscivena 
Narosodes punctana 
Nepita conferta 
Nishada flabrifera 
Nudaria diaphanella 
Nyctemera adversata 
Nyctemera coleta 
Nyctemera lacticinia 
Nyctemera latistriga 
Oeonistis entella 
Olepa anomi 
Olepa duboisi 
Olepa koslandana 
Olepa ocellifera 
Olepa ricini 
Padenia transversa 
Pangora erosa 
Pareuchaetes pseudoinsulata 
Poliosia binotata 
Pseudoblabes oophora 
Rajendra biguttata 
Scaptesyle bicolor 
Schistophleps bipuncta 
Siccia guttulosana 
Siccia minima 
Siccia nilgirica 
Siccia sordida 
Siccia tau 
Spilarctia albicornis 
Spilarctia castanea 
Spilarctia eldorado 
Spilosoma melanopsis 
Spilosoma obliqua 
Stictane fractilinea 
Stictane obliquilinea 
Stictane fusca 
Syntomoides imaon 
Tatargina ceylonensis 
Teulisna tumida 
Thumatha fuscescens 
Thumatha orientalis 
Trischalis absconditana 
Utetheisa lotrix 
Utetheisa pulchelloides 
Utriculofera fuscapex

Boletobiinae

Araeopteron griseata 
Araeopteron nivalis 
Araeopteron pictale 
Araeopteron poliophaea 
Araeopteron proleuca 
Araeopteron rufescens 
Araeopteron xanthopis 
Autoba abrupta 
Autoba angulifera 
Autoba brachygonia 
Autoba olivacea 
Condate arenacea 
Corgatha zonalis 
Enispa oblataria 
Enispa albinellus 
Enispa atricincta 
Enispa croceicincta 
Enispa minuta 
Enispa oinistis 
Enispa poliorhoda 
Enispa purpurascens 
Enispa rosea 
Enispa rubrifuscaria 
Enispa rufapicia 
Eublemma amabilis 
Eublemma anachoresis 
Eublemma baccalix 
Eublemma cochylioides 
Eublemma dimidialis 
Eublemma pudica 
Eublemma rivula  - syn. Rivula pallida
Eublemma scitulum 
Eublemma trifasciata 
Hiccoda dosaroides 
Hiccoda nigripalpis 
Homodes vivida 
Hypenagonia brachypalpia 
Hypenagonia flavisigna 
Hypenagonia longipalpis 
Hypenagonia nigrifascia 
Hypenagonia vexataria 
Metachrostis egens 
Metachrostis pectinata 
Micraeschus elataria 
Micraeschus rosellus 
Neachrostia undulata 
Oruza divisa 
Sophta ruficeps 
Tamba decolor 
Tamba lineifera 
Tamba usurpatalis 
Zurobata vacillans

Calpinae - fruit-piercing moths

Acantholipes trajecta 
Araeognatha umbrosa 
Bamra albicola 
Bamra mundata 
Belciana biformis 
Bocula pallens 
Bocula xanthostola 
Brana calopasa 
Brevipecten captata 
Buzara onelia 
Buzara umbrosa 
Caduca albopunctata 
Calesia dasyptera 
Calesia flabellifera 
Calesia fuscicorpus 
Calesia haemorrhoa 
Calesia rufipalpis 
Calesia stillifera 
Calyptra eustrigata 
Calyptra minuticornis 
Calymniops trapezata 
Chusaris figurata 
Chusaris idaeoides 
Chusaris paucimaculata 
Chusaris retatalis 
Claterna cydonia 
Corcobara angulipennis 
Cyclodes omma 
Daona mansueta 
Delgamma pangonia 
Diascia transvitta 
Dierna patibulum 
Diomea rotundata 
Dordura aliena 
Dunira scitula 
Dunira maculapex 
Dunira punctimargo 
Egnasia accingalis 
Egnasia ephyrodalis 
Egnasia ocellata 
Egnasia participalis 
Egnasia polia 
Episparis liturata 
Episparis tortuosalis 
Eudocima aurantia 
Eudocima cajeta 
Eudocima homaena 
Eudocima hypermnestra 
Eudocima materna 
Eudocima phalonia 
Eudocima salaminia 
Falana sordida 
Fodina pallula 
Fodina stola  
Gesonia obeditalis 
Goniocraspedon mistura 
Hyperlopha cristifera 
Hypocala deflorata 
Hypocala violacea 
Ilyrgis echephurealis 
Maguda palpalis 
Marapana pulverata 
Mecodina praecipua 
Mecistoptera griseifusa 
Micreremites rasalis 
Nagadeba indecoralis 
Nagadeba polia 
Nolasena ferrifervens 
Olulis lactigutta 
Olulis puncticinctalis 
Oraesia emarginata 
Oraesia provocans 
Oxygonitis sericeata 
Panilla dispila 
Pantydia metaspila 
Papuacola lignicolor 
Phyllodes consobrina 
Pilipectus prunifera 
Plusiodonta coelonota 
Pseudogyrtona perversa 
Radara subcupralis 
Ramadasa pavo 
Rema tetraspila 
Rhangena roseipennis 
Rhesala imparata 
Rhesala moestalis 
Saroba ceylonica 
Saroba maculicosta 
Saroba pustulifera 
Serrodes campana 
Serrodes partita 
Tadaxa bijungens 
Tephriopis divulsa 
Tipasa omariusalis 
Tipasa renalis

Erebinae

Achaea janata 
Achaea mercatoria 
Achaea mezentia 
Achaea serva 
Avatha bubo 
Avatha discolor 
Bastilla absentimacula 
Bastilla amygdalis 
Bastilla analis 
Bastilla arctotaenia 
Bastilla arcuata 
Bastilla crameri 
Bastilla fulvotaenia 
Bastilla simillima 
Dysgonia rigidistria 
Dysgonia calefasciens 
Dysgonia stuposa 
Dysgonia torrida 
Ercheia cyllaria 
Erebus caprimulgus 
Erebus ephesperis 
Erebus hieroglyphica 
Erebus ipsa 
Erebus macrops 
Ericeia congressa 
Ericeia elongata 
Ericeia eriophora 
Ericeia fraterna 
Ericeia inangulata 
Ericeia lituraria 
Ericeia pertendens 
Erygia apicalis 
Erygia spissa 
Grammodes geometrica 
Hulodes caranea 
Hypopyra meridionalis 
Hypopyra unistrigata 
Hypopyra vespertilio 
Hypospila bolinoides 
Lacera alope 
Lygniodes ciliata 
Lygniodes vampyrus 
Mocis frugalis 
Mocis undata 
Nagia linteola 
Ophisma gravata 
Ophiusa discriminans 
Ophiusa disjungens 
Ophiusa trapezium 
Pandesma quenavadi 
Polydesma boarmoides 
Polydesma umbricola 
Pterocyclophora pictimargo 
Speiredonia itynx 
Speiredonia mutabilis 
Speiredonia obscura 
Speiredonia substruens 
Sphingomorpha chlorea 
Spirama helicina 
Spirama indenta 
Spirama retorta 
Thyas coronata 
Thyas honesta 
Trigonodes hyppasia 
Ulotrichopus rama

Herminiinae - litter moths

Adrapsa ablualis 
Adrapsa despecta 
Adrapsa geometroides 
Adrapsa scopigera 
Bocana manifestalis 
Hadennia jutalis 
Hadennia mysalis 
Hipoepa biasalis 
Hipoepa fractalis 
Hydrillodes abavalis 
Hydrillodes gravatalis 
Hydrillodes lentalis 
Hydrillodes morosa 
Latiphea berresoides 
Lysimelia lysimeloides 
Mixomelia relata 
Nodaria cingala 
Progonia kurosawai 
Progonia oileusalis 
Simplicia bimarginata 
Simplicia butesalis 
Simplicia cornicalis 
Simplicia mistacalis 
Sinarella discisigna 
Zanclognatha minoralis

Hypeninae - snout moths

Acidon nigribasis 
Anoratha paritalis 
Arrade erebusalis 
Artigisa nigrosignata 
Bertula abjudicalis 
Britha biguttata 
Catada vagalis 
Dichromia cognata 
Dichromia indicatalis 
Dichromia occatus 
Dichromia orosia 
Dichromia pullata 
Dichromia thermesialis 
Harita rectilinea 
Hypena abyssinialis 
Hypena assimilis 
Hypena colombana 
Hypena conscitalis 
Hypena cyanea 
Hypena extensa 
Hypena griseapex 
Hypena iconicalis 
Hypena jocosalis 
Hypena labatalis 
Hypena laceratalis 
Hypena lignealis 
Hypena mandatalis 
Hypena molpusalis 
Hypena obacerralis 
Hypena obfuscalis 
Hypena quaesitalis 
Hypena varialis 
Hypena vestita 
Hypertrocta posticalis 
Naarda atrirena 
Naarda gigaloba 
Naarda huettleri 
Naarda glauculalis 
Naarda ineffectalis 
Naarda leptosigna 
Naarda umbria 
Rivula aequalis  - syn. R. biatomea
Rivula albistriga 
Rivula basalis 
Rivula bioculalis 
Rivula curvifera 
Sarobela litterata 
Stenhypena adustalis

Hypenodinae
Anachrostis nigripuncta 
Luceria novatusalis 
Schrankia croceipicta

Lymantriinae - tussock moths

Arctornis cygna 
Arctornis submarginata 
Arctornis subvitrea 
Arna apicalis 
Aroa major 
Aroa maxima 
Aroa plana 
Aroa sienna 
Aroa subnotata 
Artaxa angulata 
Artaxa digramma 
Artaxa guttata 
Artaxa vitellina 
Bembina apicalis 
Calliteara horsfieldii 
Carriola fenestrata 
Casama vilis 
Cispia alba 
Cispia punctifascia 
Dasychira mendosa 
Dasychira moerens 
Dasychira thwaitesi 
Euproctis bimaculata 
Euproctis cervina 
Euproctis flavinata 
Euproctis fraterna 
Euproctis fulvipuncta 
Euproctis lunata 
Euproctis latifascia 
Euproctis rhoda 
Euproctis semisignata 
Euproctis similis 
Euproctis varians 
Laelia cardinalis 
Laelia exclamationis 
Laelia fasciata 
Laelia suffusa 
Laelia testacea 
Lacida costalis 
Leucoma cryptadia 
Lymantria ampla 
Lymantria detersa 
Lymantria fuliginosa 
Lymantria grandis 
Lymantria incerta 
Lymantria marginata 
Lymantria serva 
Lymantria subrosea 
Lymantria todara 
Nygmia icilia 
Nygmia xanthomela 
Orgyia postica 
Orgyia viridescens 
Perina nuda 
Psalis pennatula 
Somena scintillans 
Sphrageidus xanthorrhoea 
Themaca comparata  = Artaxa comparata

Pangraptinae
Episparis varialis

Scoliopteryginae
Anomis combinans 
Anomis figlina 
Anomis fulvida 
Anomis guttanivis 
Anomis involuta 
Anomis mesogona 
Anomis nigritarsis 
Anomis privata 
Anomis sabulifera 
Dinumma placens

Tinoliinae
Tinolius eburneigutta

Ethmiidae - ethmiid moths
Ethmia assamensis

Eupterotidae - giant lappet moths

Apona shevaroyensis 
Eupterote citheronia 
Eupterote diffusa 
Eupterote fabia 
Eupterote geminata 
Eupterote mollifera 
Eupterote murina 
Eupterote nigriceps 
Eupterote placida 
Eupterote plumipes 
Eupterote subcurvifera 
Eupterote undata 
Eupterote vialis 
Ganisa postica 
Pandala dolosa

Gelechiidae - twirler moths

Acleris sagmatias 
Anarsia phortica 
Aphanostola sparsipalpis 
Athrips studiosa 
Brachmia antichroa 
Brachmia episticta 
Chlorolychnis agnatella 
Dactylethrella candida 
Dactylethrella globulata 
Dactylethrella incondita 
Deltoplastis byssina 
Deltoplastis clerodotis 
Deltoplastis cognata 
Deltoplastis commatopa 
Deltoplastis cremnaspis 
Deltoplastis figurata 
Deltoplastis figurodigita 
Deltoplastis lamellospina 
Deltoplastis propensa 
Deltoplastis straminicornis 
Dichomeris acrochlora 
Dichomeris deltaspis 
Epichostis metrodelta 
Epimimastis escharitis 
Ficulea blandulella 
Harmatitis sphecopa 
Helcystogramma amethystium 
Helcystogramma anthistis 
Helcystogramma arotraeum 
Helcystogramma aruritis 
Helcystogramma epicentra 
Helcystogramma hapalyntis 
Helcystogramma hibisci 
Helcystogramma hoplophorum 
Helcystogramma infibulatum 
Helcystogramma immeritella 
Helcystogramma leucoplectum 
Helcystogramma lochistis 
Helcystogramma philomusum 
Helcystogramma phryganitis 
Helcystogramma xerastis 
Hypatima spathota 
Idiophantis anisosticta 
Idiophantis chiridota 
Idiophantis discura 
Idiophantis paraptila 
Idiophantis soreuta 
Ischnodoris chlorosperma 
Ischnodoris sigalota 
Latrologa aoropis 
Mesophleps ioloncha 
Narthecoceros logica 
Narthecoceros platyconta 
Narthecoceros xylodes 
Organitis characopa 
Organitis lubrica 
Palintropa hippica 
Pectinophora gossypiella 
Pharangitis spathias 
Proadamas indefessa 
Psorosticha zizyphi 
Scrobipalpa heliopa 
Sitotroga cerealella 
Stenolechia orsicoma 
Stenolechia trichaspis 
Thiotricha orthiastis 
Trichembola fuscata 
Tricyanaula aurantiaca

Geometridae - geometer moths

Abraxas leucostola 
Abraxas sordida 
Achrosis rondelaria 
Achrosis serpentinaria 
Acidaliastis micra 
Agathia conviridaria 
Agathia hemithearia 
Agathia laetata 
Agathia magnifica 
Amblychia angeronaria 
Amblychia hymenaria 
Aplochlora vivilaca 
Aporandria specularia 
Argyrocosma inductaria 
Astygisa vexillaria 
Axinoptera subcostalis 
Berta chrysolineata 
Biston suppressaria 
Boarmia ceylonaria 
Bosara emarginaria 
Borbacha pardaria 
Bylazora infumata 
Cacochloris uvidula 
Calletaera postvittata 
Calluga costalis 
Carbia pulchrilinea 
Catoria sublavaria 
Celenna festivaria 
Chiasmia emersaria 
Chiasmia nora 
Chiasmia normata 
Chiasmia sufflata 
Chlorochaeta integranota 
Chloroclystis emarginaria 
Chloroclystis filicata 
Chorodna strixaria 
Chrysocraspeda abhadraca 
Chrysocraspeda faganaria 
Chrysocraspeda olearia 
Chrysocraspeda tristicula 
Cleora alienaria 
Cleora injectaria 
Cleora taprobana 
Collix ghosha 
Collix hypospilata 
Collix rufipalpis 
Comibaena cassidara 
Comostola chlorargyra 
Comostola laesaria 
Comostola pyrrhogona 
Comostola subtiliaria 
Conolophia nigripuncta 
Corymica specularia 
Cusiala raptaria 
Cusuma flavifusa 
Cusuma vilis 
Cyclophora nebulosata 
Cyclophora obstataria 
Cyclothea disjuncta 
Dasyboarmia subpilosa 
Derambila lumenaria 
Derambila saponaria 
Dysphania palmyra 
Dysphania prunicolor 
Ecliptopera dissecta 
Ecliptopera muscicolor 
Ecliptopera subnubila 
Ectropis bhurmitra 
Entomopteryx combusta 
Eois dissimilis 
Eois grataria 
Eois lunulosa 
Epipristis minimaria 
Eriopithex recensitaria 
Eucrostes disparata 
Eucyclodes divapala 
Eucyclodes gavissima 
Eucyclodes semialba 
Eumelea ludovicata 
Eumelea rosalia 
Eupithecia albifurva 
Eupithecia costalis 
Eupithecia melanolopha 
Eupithecia niveivena 
Eupithecia singhalensis 
Fascellina chromataria 
Glaucoclystis immixtaria 
Glaucoclystis polyclealis 
Gnamptopteryx perficita 
Gonanticlea occlusata 
Gonodontis clelia 
Gymnoscelis admixtaria 
Gymnoscelis deleta 
Gymnoscelis ectochloros 
Gymnoscelis imparatalis 
Gymnoscelis roseifascia 
Gymnoscelis tibialis 
Gymnoscelis tristrigosa 
Hemithea marina 
Herochroma baibarana 
Herochroma orientalis 
Herochroma subspoliata 
Heterostegane aurantiaca 
Heterostegane rectifascia 
Hyperythra lutea 
Hypochrosis chlorozonaria 
Hypochrosis hyadaria 
Hypomecis adamata 
Hypomecis separata 
Hypomecis transcissa 
Hyposidra talaca 
Idaea actiosaria 
Idaea gemmaria 
Idaea lineata 
Idaea marcidaria 
Idaea micra 
Idaea mutanda 
Idaea phoenicoglauca 
Idaea purpurea 
Idaea semisericea 
Idiochlora caudularia 
Isturgia catalaunaria 
Isturgia pulinda 
Lomographa inamata 
Lophophleps phoenicoptera 
Loxofidonia cingala 
Luxiaria phyllosaria 
Maxates acutissima 
Maxates coelataria 
Maxates dissimulata 
Mesotrophe intortaria 
Mixocera parvulata 
Microloxia herbaria 
Mnesiloba dentifascia 
Mnesiloba intentata 
Nadagara vigaia 
Naxa textilis 
Noreia ajaia 
Oenospila flavifusata 
Organopoda carnearia 
Orthocabera obliqua 
Ophthalmitis caritaria 
Ophthalmitis herbidaria 
Ophthalmitis sinensium 
Orothalassodes falsaria 
Orothalassodes leucospilota 
Orthonama obstipata 
Oxymacaria ceylonica 
Ozola microniaria 
Ozola minor 
Pamphlebia rubrolimbraria 
Pelagodes spiniseparati 
Pelagodes clarifimbria 
Pelagodes furvifimbria 
Perixera absconditaria 
Perixera monetaria 
Perixera obliviaria 
Perixera obrinaria 
Petelia immaculata 
Petelia medardaria 
Plutodes exiguifascia 
Plutodes transmutata 
Pomasia psylaria 
Polynesia sunandava 
Probithia exclusa 
Probithia obstataria 
Problepsis deliaria 
Pydna metaphsea 
Racotis boarmiaria 
Rhinoprora palpata 
Ruttelerona cessaria 
Sauris hirudinata 
Sauris interruptata 
Sauris lineosa 
Sauris nigripalpata 
Sauris perfasciata 
Sauris proboscidaria 
Scardamia bractearia 
Scardamia metallaria 
Scopula actuaria 
Scopula addictaria 
Scopula adeptaria 
Scopula alstoni 
Scopula aspilataria 
Scopula costata 
Scopula divisaria 
Scopula emissaria 
Scopula ferruginea 
Scopula fibulata 
Scopula intensata 
Scopula modesta 
Scopula nesciaria 
Scopula opicata 
Scopula pedilata 
Scopula pulchellata 
Scopula walkeri 
Semiothisa frugaliata 
Semiothisa eleonora 
Semiothisa ozararia 
Semiothisa perfusaria 
Semiothisa quadraria 
Somatina omicraria 
Somatina purpurascens 
Spaniocentra pannosa 
Symmacra solidaria 
Synegia imitaria 
Thalassodes immissaria 
Thalassodes quadraria 
Thalassodes veraria 
Thinopteryx crocoptera 
Timandra comptaria 
Timandra convectaria 
Traminda aventiaria 
Traminda mundissima 
Xanthorhoe molata 
Zamarada baliata 
Zeheba lucidata 
Ziridava xylinaria

Glyphipterigidae - sedge moths

Glyphipterix antidoxa 
Glyphipterix argyromis 
Glyphipterix ditiorana 
Glyphipterix hemipempta 
Glyphipterix maschalis 
Glyphipterix molybdora 
Glyphipterix orymagdis 
Glyphipterix oxycopis 
Glyphipterix psychopa 
Glyphipterix sclerodes 
Glyphipterix stilata 
Glyphipterix tetrachrysa

Gracillariidae - leaf-blotch miner moths

Acrocercops bisinuata 
Acrocercops brochogramma 
Acrocercops castellata 
Acrocercops coffeifoliella 
Acrocercops convoluta 
Acrocercops euthycolona 
Acrocercops geologica 
Acrocercops isodelta 
Acrocercops lyrica 
Acrocercops plocamis 
Acrocercops praeclusa 
Acrocercops stricta 
Acrocercops strophala 
Acrocercops telearcha 
Acrocercops tenera 
Acrocercops tetracrena 
Acrocercops triacris 
Acrocercops ustulatella 
Acrocercops zadocaea 
Caloptilia acrotherma 
Caloptilia argalea 
Caloptilia ariana 
Caloptilia dogmatica 
Caloptilia euryptera 
Caloptilia iselaea 
Caloptilia leucolitha 
Caloptilia perisphena 
Caloptilia phalaropa 
Caloptilia prismatica 
Caloptilia scaeodesma 
Caloptilia syrphetias 
Caloptilia theivora 
Caloptilia zachrysa 
Corythoxestis pentarcha 
Cyphosticha acrolitha 
Epicephala albifrons 
Epicephala exetastis 
Epicephala flagellata 
Epicephala frenata 
Epicephala trigonophora 
Gibbovalva quadrifasciata 
Macarostola hieranthes 
Macarostola paradisia 
Macarostola thiasodes 
Macarostola thriambica 
Melanocercops desiccata 
Parectopa capnias 
Parectopa picroglossa 
Phrixosceles campsigrapha 
Phrixosceles literaria 
Phyllocnistis citrella 
Phyllocnistis selenopa 
Phyllonorycter conista 
Povolnya platycosma 
Stomphastis chalybacma 
Synnympha diluviata

Heliodinidae - sun moths
 Trichothyrsa pyrrhocoma 
 Trichothyrsa taedifera

Hepialidae - ghost moths
Endoclita purpurescens 
Endoclita signifer 
Palpifer taprobanus

Hyblaeidae - teak moths
Hyblaea constellata 
Hyblaea puera

Immidae - imma moths

Imma albofascia 
Imma accuralis 
Imma chlorosphena 
Imma ergasia 
Imma grammarcha 
Imma hyphantis 
Imma lithosioides 
Imma mackwoodi 
Imma mylias 
Imma psoricopa 
Imma rugosalis 
Imma semicitra 
Moca velutina

Lacturidae - tropical burnet moths
Anticrates chrysantha 
Pyrozela xanthomima

Lasiocampidae - tent and lappet moths

Chilena strigula 
Euthrix laeta 
Gastropacha pardale 
Kunugia latipennis 
Lenodora vittata 
Metanastria hyrtaca 
Odonestis ceylonica 
Odonestis bheroba 
Odonestis vita 
Streblote dorsalis 
Suana concolor 
Trabala vishnou

Lecithoceridae - long-horned moths

Alciphanes clavata 
Antiochtha achnastis 
Antiochtha balbidota 
Antiochtha cataclina 
Antiochtha coelatella 
Antiochtha longivincula 
Antiochtha oxyzona 
Antiochtha stellulata 
Antiochtha vigilax 
Carodista fabajuxta 
Carodista grypotatos 
Carodista tribrachia 
Carodista wilpattuae 
Deltoplastis acrophanes 
Deltoplastis amicella 
Deltoplastis byssina 
Deltoplastis cremnaspis 
Deltoplastis clerodotis 
Deltoplastis cognata 
Deltoplastis figurata 
Deltoplastis figurodigita 
Deltoplastis lamellospina 
Deltoplastis laminospina 
Deltoplastis propensa 
Deltoplastis stramminicornis 
Doxogenes ceraena 
Doxogenes henicosura 
Eccedoxa thenara 
Frisilia ceylonica 
Frisilia neacantha 
Frisilia serrata 
Frisilia thapsina 
Frisilia tricosura 
Frisilia trizeugma 
Homaloxestis grabia 
Homaloxestis lacerta 
Homaloxestis ochrosceles 
Hygroplasta merinxa 
Hygroplasta monila 
Hygroplasta onyxijuxta 
Hygroplasta promyctera 
Hygroplasta spoliatella 
Hyperochtha tanyglocha 
Hygroplasta utricula 
Kalocyrma epileuca 
Kalocyrma oxygonia 
Lecithocera alternella 
Lecithocera autologa 
Lecithocera caecilia 
Lecithocera capnaula 
Lecithocera combusta 
Lecithocera cornutella 
Lecithocera crypsigenes 
Lecithocera epomia 
Lecithocera exophthalma 
Lecithocera fornacalis 
Lecithocera glaphyritis 
Lecithocera haemylopis 
Lecithocera homocentra 
Lecithocera itrinea 
Lecithocera mazina 
Lecithocera mesosura 
Lecithocera metopaena 
Lecithocera omphacias 
Lecithocera phratriastis 
Lecithocera plicata 
Lecithocera pogonikuma 
Lecithocera sinuosa 
Lecithocera signifera 
Lecithocera sporochlora 
Mnesteria pharetrata 
Odites atmopa 
Odites isocentra 
Odites orthometra 
Odites paracyrta 
Odites psilotis 
Onebala blandiella 
Philharmonia insigna 
Psammoris carpaea 
Quassitagma duplicata 
Quassitagma laminospina 
Teucrodoxa monetella 
Thubana xanthoteles 
Timyra aulonitis 
Timyra caulisivena 
Timyra machlas 
Timyra metallanthes 
Timyra oculinota 
Timyra sphenias 
Timyra stenomacra 
Tisis mendicella 
Torodora facula 
Torodora piscarifurca 
Torodora ventralilata

Limacodidae - slug caterpillar moths

Altha adala 
Altha nivea 
Altha subnotata 
Aphendala ferreogrisea 
Aphendala recta 
Birthama obliquifascia 
Cheromettia apicata  - syn. Belippa laleana
Cheromettia ferruginea 
Macroplectra ceylonica 
Macroplectra nararia 
Miresa albipuncta 
Miresa argentifera 
Miresa sibinoides 
Narosa conspersa 
Narosa fletcheri 
Natada sericea 
Oxyplax ochracea 
Parasa bicolor 
Parasa hampsoni 
Parasa hilaris 
Parasa lepida 
Parasa similis 
Rarithea phocea 
Scopelodes venosa 
Spatulifimbria castaneiceps 
Thosea aperiens 
Thosea cana 
Thosea cervina

Lyonetiidae - lyonet moths
Crobylophora daricella 
Crobylophora staterias 
Leucoptera coffeella 
Lyonetia leurodes 
Lyonetia praefulva 
Prytaneutis clavigera

Momphidae - mompha moths
 Bifascioides leucomelanella 
 Patanotis harmosta 
 Patanotis metallidias 
 Phalaritica vindex

Nepticulidae - nepticulid moths
 Ectoedemia sporadopa 
 Stigmella polydoxa

Noctuidae - owlet moths
 Adisura atkinsoni 
 Ariola coelisigna 
 Blasticorhinus
 Brithys crini 
 Chrysodeixis acuta 
 Chrysodeixis chalcites 
 Chrysodeixis permissa 
 Helicoverpa armigera 
 Polytela gloriosae 
 Rabila frontalis 
 Pseudacidalia albicosta 
 Tathodelta purpurascens 
 Trisula variegata

Acontiinae - bird dropping moths

Acontia crocata 
Acontia marmoralis 
Acontia opalinoides 
Acontia sexpunctata 
Arasada pyraliformis 
Arenarba destituta 
Aroana cingalensis 
Carmara subcervina 
Cerynea contentaria 
Cerynea ustula 
Cingalesa strigicosta 
Cophanta funestalis 
Corgatha albivertex 
Corgatha atrifalcis 
Corgatha minor 
Corgatha semipardata 
Corgatha trichogyia 
Corgatha zonalis 
Deltote flavifrons 
Enispa elataria 
Erastroides oliviaria 
Holocryptis erubescens 
Hyposada postvittata 
Lophoruza lunifera 
Maliattha lativitta 
Maliattha renalis 
Maliattha signifera 
Niaccaba sumptualis 
Pseudozarba mianoides 
Sugia stygia 
Zurobata vacillans

Acronictinae
Acronicta pruinosa 
Ancara obliterans 
Athetis reclusa 
Athetis renalis 
Craniophora fasciata 
Simyra confusa

Agaristinae
Aegocera bimacula 
Aegocera venulia 
Episteme nigripennis 
Mimeusemia ceylonica

Amphipyrinae
Aucha velans 
Callyna costiplaga 
Callyna jugaria 
Callyna monoleuca 
Iambia thwaitesii

Bryophilinae
Cryphia postochrea

Catocalinae

Aedia leucomelas 
Amphigonia hepatizans 
Anticarsia irrorata 
Arcte coerula 
Arcte taprobana 
Arsacia rectalis 
Artena dotata 
Attatha regalis 
Avitta ophiusalis 
Avitta quadrilinea 
Avitta rufifrons 
Avitta subsignans 
Blasticorhinus rivulosa 
Chalciope mygdon 
Chrysopera combinans 
Entomogramma fautrix 
Entomogramma torsa 
Ischyja manlia 
Macaldenia palumba 
Oxyodes scrobiculata 
Pindara illibata 
Platyja umminia 
Psimada quadripennis 
Sympis rufibasis

Condicinae
Bagada spicea 
Condica dolorosa

Eustrotiinae
Amyna axis 
Amyna natalis 
Amyna punctum 
Naranga diffusa

Euteliinae

 Anigraea cinctipalpis 
 Anuga constricta 
 Anuga multiplicans 
 Chlumetia transversa 
 Eutelia approximata 
 Eutelia favillatrix 
 Eutelia geyeri 
 Penicillaria jocosatrix 
 Penicillaria lineatrix 
 Penicillaria ludatrix 
 Penicillaria nugatrix 
 Targalla bifacies 
 Targalla repleta

Hadeninae - hants moths

 Actinotia intermediata 
 Apospasta pannosa 
 Callopistria apicalis 
 Callopistria maillardi 
 Callopistria rivularis 
 Callopistria thalpophiloides 
 Chasmina candida 
 Chasmina fasciculosa 
 Conservula v-brunneum 
 Corythurus nocturnus 
 Dictyestra dissectus 
 Dypterygia cristifera 
 Elusa subjecta 
 Euplexia albonota 
 Feliniopsis indistans 
 Feliniopsis opposita 
 Hadula trifolii 
 Leucania loreyi 
 Leucania roseilinea 
 Leucania venalba 
 Leucania yu 
 Mudaria albonotata 
 Mudaria fisherae 
 Mudaria leprosticta 
 Mythimna consanguis 
 Mythimna decisissima 
 Mythimna denticula 
 Mythimna irrorata 
 Mythimna hamifera 
 Mythimna obscura 
 Mythimna pallidicosta 
 Mythimna reversa 
 Mythimna separata 
 Paradiopa postfusca 
 Paradrina clavipalpis 
 Sasunaga tenebrosa 
 Sesamia inferens 
 Spodoptera apertura 
 Spodoptera exigua 
 Spodoptera frugiperda 
 Spodoptera litura 
 Spodoptera mauritia 
 Spodoptera picta 
 Stenopterygia subcurva 
 Tiracola plagiata 
 Trachea melanospila 
 Xylostola indistincta 
 Yepcalphis dilectissima

Noctuinae
 Agrotis segetum 
 Agrotis spinifera 
 Agrotis ipsilon 
 Diarsia ochracea 
 Ochropleura plecta 
 Oroplexia retrahens 
 Xestia c-nigrum

Pantheinae
 Trichosea champa

Plusiinae - looper moths

 Anadevidia peponis 
 Argyrogramma signata 
 Chrysodeixis eriosoma 
 Ctenoplusia albostriata 
 Ctenoplusia fracta 
 Ctenoplusia limbirena 
 Dactyloplusia impulsa 
 Scriptoplusia nigriluna 
 Trichoplusia lectula 
 Trichoplusia ni 
 Trichoplusia obtusisigna 
 Thysanoplusia orichalcea 
 Zonoplusia ochreata

Stictopterinae
 Aegilia describens 
 Gyrtona hylusalis 
 Lophoptera squammigera 
 Stictoptera cucullioides 
 Stictoptera trajiciens

Tinoliinae
 Poeta quadrinotata

Toxocampinae
 Lygephila dorsigera

Xyleninae
 Acrapex hamulifera 
 Acrapex prisca

Nolidae - nolid moths

 Aiteta apriformis 
 Aiteta damnipennis 
 Aiteta truncata 
 Aquis orbicularis 
 Aquita acontioides 
 Barasa acronyctoides 
 Beara dichromella 
 Beana terminigera 
 Blenina accipiens 
 Blenina chlorophila 
 Blenina donans 
 Carea angulata 
 Carea obsolescens 
 Carea varipes 
 Cacyparis insolitata 
 Churia maculata 
 Earias cupreoviridis 
 Earias fabia 
 Earias flavida 
 Earias luteolaria 
 Eligma narcissus 
 Etanna basalis 
 Giaura tortricoides 
 Inouenola grisalis 
 Labanda chloromela 
 Labanda fasciata 
 Labanda herbealis 
 Labanda saturalis 
 Labanda semipars 
 Lasiolopha saturata 
 Lophothripa vitea 
 Maceda mansueta 
 Manoba major 
 Maurilia iconica 
 Meganola brunellus 
 Nanaguna breviuscula 
 Negeta contrariata 
 Nola analis 
 Nola angulata 
 Nola ceylonica 
 Nola cingalesa 
 Nola dentilinea 
 Nola fasciata 
 Nola fuscibasalis 
 Nola leucoscopula 
 Nola lucidalis 
 Nola mesotherma 
 Nola pascua 
 Nola rufa 
 Nola rufimixta 
 Nola streptographia 
 Nola squalida 
 Nola tumulifera 
 Nycteola indica 
 Nycteola indicatana 
 Nycteola poliophaea 
 Paracrama dulcissima 
 Plotheia decrescens 
 Pterogonia aurigutta 
 Pterogonia nubes 
 Ptisciana seminivea 
 Risoba repugnans 
 Risoba obstructa 
 Risoba prominens 
 Selepa celtis 
 Selepa discigera 
 Selepa plumbeata 
 Xanthodes intersepta 
 Xanthodes transversa 
 Xenochroa chlorostigma 
 Westermannia superba

Notodontidae - prominent moths

Antheua servula 
Cerura liturata 
Chadisra bipars 
Clostera restitura 
Hyperaeschrella dentata 
Clostera anachoreta 
Netria viridescens 
Norraca longipennis 
Phalera grotei 
Phycidopsis albovittata 
Ramesa tosta 
Somera viridifusca 
Sphetta apicalis 
Stauropus alternus 
Stauropus dentilinea

Oecophoridae 
Acria ceramitis 
Acria emarginella 
Acria obtusella 
Eido autogramma 
Macrosaces thermopa 
Psaltica monochorda 
Tonica niviferana

Stathmopodinae

Hieromantis fibulata 
Hieromantis ioxysta 
Oedematopoda cypris 
Pachyrhabda bacterias 
Pachyrhabda dicastis 
Pachyrhabda tumida 
Stathmopoda aconias 
Stathmopoda auriferella 
Stathmopoda diplaspis 
Stathmopoda hexatyla 
Stathmopoda iners 
Stathmopoda masinissa 
Stathmopoda stimulata 
Stathmopoda triloba 
Thylacosceles cerata 
Thylacosceles judex

Plutellidae - diamondback moths
Leuroperna sera

Pterophoridae - plume moths

Adaina microdactyla 
Agdistopis sinhala 
Amblyptilia direptalis 
Buckleria paludum 
Cosmoclostis leucomochla 
Deuterocopus planeta 
Deuterocopus ritsemae 
Deuterocopus socotranus 
Diacrotricha fasciola 
Exelastis phlyctaenias 
Hellinsia lienigianus 
Hepalastis pumilio 
Megalorhipida leucodactyla 
Nippoptilia regulus 
Ochyrotica concursa 
Oxyptilus causodes 
Oxyptilus epidectis 
Platyptilia citropleura 
Platyptilia molopias 
Procapperia pelecyntes 
Pterophorus leucadactylus 
Pterophorus melanopodus 
Pterophorus niveodactyla 
Sphenarches anisodactylus 
Sphenarches zanclistes 
Stangeia xerodes 
Stenodacma wahlbergi 
Stenodacma pyrrhodes 
Stenoptilia petraea 
Stenoptilodes taprobanes 
Trichoptilus regalis 
Xyroptila vaughani

Psychidae - bagworm moths

Acanthopsyche cana 
Acanthopsyche subteralbata 
Aprata mackwoodii 
Bambalina consorta 
Chaliella doubledaii 
Chalioides vitrea 
Eumeta crameri 
Eumeta variegata 
Eurukuttarus rotunda 
Heylaertsia fusca 
Heylaertsia griseata 
Heylaertsia nudilineata 
Heylaertsia quadripuncta 
Manatha albipes 
Metisa plana 
Narycia marmarurga 
Narycia obserata 
Narycia platyzona 
Pteroma plagiophleps 
Pteroxys goniatus 
Pteroxys uniformis 
Psomocolax rhabdophora 
Sapheneutis camerata 
Sapheneutis metacentra 
Typhonia anasactis 
Typhonia autopetra 
Typhonia energa 
Typhonia expressa 
Typhonia frenigera 
Typhonia granularis 
Typhonia leucosceptra 
Typhonia metherca 
Typhonia stratifica 
Typhonia tetraspila

Pyralidae - pyralid moths
Bostra gnidusalis 
Cryptophycita deflandrella 
Emmalocera apotomella 
Emmalocera nigricostalis 
Guastica semilutea

Epipaschiinae
Coenodomus trichasema 
Stericta divitalis

Gallerinae

Achroia grisella 
Achroia innotata 
Agdistopis sinhala 
Aphomia monochroa 
Aphomia odontella 
Aphomia sopozhnikovi 
Aphomia vinotincta 
Aphomia zelleri 
Corcyra cephalonica 
Doloessa ochrociliella 
Doloessa viridis 
Ertzica morosella 
Lamoria adaptella 
Lamoria anella 
Lamoria infumatella 
Lamoria jordanis 
Lamoria virescens 
Picrogama nigrisparsalis 
Prasinoxena metaleuca 
Stenachroia elongella 
Taurometopa aryrostrota 
Tirathaba rufivena 
Trachylepidia fructicassiella

Phycitinae

Addyme aspiciella 
Ammatucha semiirrorella 
Ancylodes lapsalis 
Anerastia celsella 
Anonaepestis bengalella 
Assara albicostalis 
Assara seminivale 
Aurana actiosella 
Cadra cautella 
Calguia defiguralis 
Cathyalia fulvella 
Ceroprepes patriciella 
Ceroprepes proximalis 
Citripestis sagittiferella 
Coleothrix longicosta 
Coleothrix swinhoeella 
Copamyntis infusella 
Copamyntis obliquifasciella 
Cryptoblabes angustipennella 
Cryptoblabes ephestialis 
Cryptoblabes proleucella 
Dipha aphidivora 
Epicrocis festivella 
Epicrocis hilarella 
Etiella grisea 
Etiella zinckenella 
Euzophera perticella 
Euzopherodes albicans 
Faveria leucophaeella 
Hyphantidium albicostale 
Hypsipyla elachistalis 
Hypsipyla robusta 
Maliarpha separatella 
Metacrateria pulverulella 
Phycita atrisquamella 
Phycita clientella 
Phycita eulepidella 
Phycita nodicornella 
Polyocha vesculella 
Pseudodavara haemaphoralis 
Saluria inficita 
Saluria ochridorsella 
Sandrabatis crassiella 
Singhalia sarcoglauca 
Spatulipalpia pallicostalis 
Thylacoptila paurosema 
Volobilis biplaga 
Volobilis chloropterella 
Zitha torridalis

Pyralinae

Endotricha albicilia 
Endotricha loricata 
Endotricha mesenterialis 
Endotricha ruminalis 
Hymenia perspectalis 
Hypsopygia nonusalis 
Loryma recusata 
Tanyethira duplicilinea 
Thiallela ligeralis 
Triphassa bilineata 
Vitessa suradeva

Saturniidae - giant silkworm and royal moths
Actias selene  - ssp. taprobanis
Antheraea cingalesa 
Antheraea pernyi  ...?
Antheraea paphia  ...?
Attacus atlas  ...?
Attacus taprobanis 
Cricula ceylonica 
Cricula trifenestrata  ...?

Sesiidae - clearwing moths
Chamanthedon flavipes 
Melittia bombyliformis  - syn. Melittia chalciformis
Oligophlebia nigralba 
Synanthedon flavicaudata

Sphingidae - sphinx moths

Acosmeryx shervillii 
Acherontia lachesis 
Acherontia styx 
Agrius convolvuli 
Ambulyx moorei 
Ambulyx substrigilis 
Amplypterus panopus 
Angonyx krishna 
Cephonodes hylas 
Cypa ferruginea 
Daphnis hypothous 
Daphnis layardii 
Daphnis minima 
Daphnis nerii 
Eupanacra busiris 
Hippotion boerhaviae 
Hippotion celerio 
Hippotion rafflesii 
Hippotion rosetta 
Hippotion velox 
Leucophlebia lineata 
Macroglossum affictitia 
Macroglossum assimilis 
Macroglossum belis 
Macroglossum corythus 
Macroglossum glaucoptera 
Macroglossum gyrans 
Macroglossum insipida 
Macroglossum mitchellii 
Macroglossum passalus 
Macroglossum prometheus 
Macroglossum pyrrhosticta 
Macroglossum sitiene 
Macroglossum sylvia 
Marumba dyras 
Megacorma obliqua 
Meganoton nyctiphanes 
Neogurelca hyas 
Nephele hespera 
Pergesa acteus 
Polyptychus trilineatus 
Psilogramma bartschereri 
Psilogramma increta 
Psilogramma menephron 
Psilogramma renneri 
Psilogramma vates 
Theretra alecto 
Theretra boisduvalii 
Theretra clotho 
Theretra gnoma 
Theretra latreillii 
Theretra lycetus 
Theretra nessus 
Theretra oldenlandiae 
Theretra pallicosta 
Theretra silhetensis

Thyrididae - picture-winged leaf moths

Addaea trimeronalis 
Aglaopus glareola 
Banisia lobata 
Banisia myrsusalis 
Calindoea argentalis 
Dixoa albatalis 
Dysodia ignita 
Dysodia viridatrix 
Hypolamprus angulalis 
Hypolamprus bastialis 
Hypolamprus lepraota 
Hypolamprus striatalis 
Hypolamprus subrosealis 
Mathoris loceusalis 
Novobelura dohertyi 
Pharambara micacealis 
Pharambara splendida 
Rhodoneura discopis 
Rhodoneura disparalis 
Rhodoneura nitens 
Striglina scitaria

Tineidae - fungus moths

Amphixystis artiphanes 
Amphixystis cincinnata 
Amphixystis commatias 
Amphixystis copidora 
Amphixystis heteroclina 
Amphixystis ligyropa 
Amphixystis tachygrapha 
Cimitra seclusella 
Edosa opsigona 
Erechthias dissimulans 
Erechthias flavistriata 
Erechthias minuscula 
Erechthias pachygramma 
Erechthias simulans 
Erechthias transfumata 
Erechthias zebrina 
Harmaclona tephrantha 
Ippa inceptrix 
Ippa polyscia 
Ippa recitatella 
Ippa taxiarcha 
Monopis monachella 
Opogona amphicausta 
Opogona doxophanes 
Opogona flavofasciata 
Opogona fumiceps 
Opogona isotalanta 
Opogona lamprophanes 
Opogona orchestris 
Opogona percnodes 
Opogona sacchari 
Opogona stathmota 
Opogona tergemina 
Opogona trigonomis 
Peristactis taraxias 
Phaeoses chalinota 
Phereoeca allutella  or Phereoeca uterella - not confirmed the species.
Scalmatica constrata 
Tineovertex melliflua 
Tinissa torvella 
Trichophaga mormopis 
Trichophaga tapetzella 
Wegneria lachanitis

Tortricidae - leaf-roller moths

Acanthoclita balanoptycha 
Acanthoclita acrocroca 
Acanthoclita iridorphna 
Acanthoclita balia 
Acleris extensana 
Acleris loxoscia 
Acleris sagmatias 
Acroclita cheradonta 
Acroclita sicaria 
Acroclita vigescens 
Adoxophyes fasciculana 
Adoxophyes privatana 
Aemulatrix aequilibra 
Age onychistica 
Anathamna megalozona 
Ancylis ancorata 
Ancylis rostrifera 
Ancylis stenampyx 
Ancylis tumida 
Antaeola antaea 
Arcesis threnodes 
Archimaga pyractis 
Archips eupatris 
Archips gyraleus 
Archips micaceana 
Archips mimicus 
Articolla cyclidias 
Bactra angulata 
Bactra cerata 
Bactra chariessa 
Bactra copidotes 
Bactra coronata 
Bactra honesta 
Bactra leucogama 
Bactra minima 
Bactra optanias 
Bactra tornastis 
Bactra venosana 
Brachiolia egenella 
Cnesteboda celligera 
Cnesteboda haruspex 
Costosa rhodantha 
Crocidosema lantana 
Crocidosema plebejana 
Crusimetra verecunda 
Cryptaspasma brachyptycha 
Cryptaspasma helota 
Cryptophlebia ombrodelta 
Cryptophlebia rhynchias 
Cyclacanthina monosema 
Cydia aelina 
Cydia chelias 
Cydia leucostoma 
Cydia obliqua 
Dactylioglypha tonica 
Dasodis microphthora 
Dicephalarcha anemodes 
Dicnecidia cataclasta 
Didrimys harmonica  
Diplocalyptis operosa 
Diplosemaphora amphibola 
Dudua aprobola 
Dudua charadraea 
Eboda smaragdinana 
Eccopsis inflicta 
Endothenia citharistis 
Endothenia rhachistis 
Epinotia canthonias 
Eucoenogenes ancyrota 
Eucosma capitulata 
Eucosma cremnitis 
Eucosma ocladias 
Eucosma rhymogramma 
Eucosmophyes icelitodes 
Eupoecilia anisoneura 
Eupoecilia charixantha 
Eupoecilia cracens 
Eupoecilia eucalypta 
Fibuloides corinthia 
Fibuloides cyanopsis 
Fibuloides neaera 
Fulcrifera tricentra 
Gatesclarkeana erotias 
Gnathmocerodes tonsoria 
Grapholita dysaethria 
Grapholita schizodelta 
Grapholita isacma 
Grapholita obliqua 
Gynnidomorpha permixtana 
Gypsonoma aechnemorpha 
Gypsonoma anthracitis 
Hedya iophaea 
Heleanna physalodes 
Helictophanes dryocoma 
Hermenias implexa 
Hermenias pachnitis 
Hermenias palmicola 
Herpystis jejuna 
Hilarographa caminodes 
Hilarographa hermatodes 
Homona coffearia 
Homona encausta 
Irianassa sapphiropa 
Isodemis serpentinana 
Kennelia albifascies 
Lasiognatha mormopa 
Licigena sertula 
Lobesia aeolopa 
Lobesia fetialis 
Lobesia genialis 
Lobesia lithogonia 
Loboschiza koenigiana 
Lopharcha chalcophanes 
Lopharcha erioptila 
Lopharcha halidora 
Lopharcha rapax 
Lumaria probolias 
Lumaria pusillana 
Macrobathra nomaea 
Matsumuraeses trophiodes 
Megaherpystis melanoneura 
Megalota fallax 
Meridemis detractana 
Meridemis invalidana 
Metendothenia fidelis 
Metendothenia organica 
Metrernis ochrolina 
Metrioglypha confertana 
Microsarotis palamedes 
Microsarotis lucida 
Nenomoshia poetica 
Neocalyptis affinisana 
Ophiorrhabda cellifera 
Pammene critica 
Pammenemima ochropa 
Periphoeba palmodes 
Phricanthes flexilineana 
Planostocha cumulata 
Polylopha epidesma 
Prophaecasia anthion 
Proschistis zaleuta 
Psilacantha creserias 
Pyrgotis siderantha 
Rhectogonia ancalota 
Rhopobota multiplex 
Rhopobota scleropa 
Rhopobota falcigera 
Rhopobota naevana 
Scoliographa acanthis 
Sorolopha bryana 
Sorolopha archimedias 
Sorolopha compsitis 
Sorolopha phyllochlora 
Sorolopha semiculta 
Spanistoneura acrospodia 
Statherotis leucaspis 
Statherotis decorata 
Statherotis agitata 
Strepsicrates rhothia 
Sychnochlaena megalorhis 
Syntozyga ephippias 
Temnolopha mosaica 
Tetramoera isogramma 
Thaumatotibia encarpa 
Trophocosta cyanoxantha 
Trymalitis cataracta 
Trymalitis margarias

Uraniidae - swallowtail moths

Acropteris ciniferaria 
Decetia subobscurata 
Dysaethria conflictaria  - also as Epiplema conflictaria
Dysaethria fulvihamata 
Dysaethria obscuraria 
Dysaethria quadricaudata 
Dysaethria rhagavata 
Dysaethria scopocera 
Epiplema albida 
Epiplema irrorata 
Epiplema latifasciata 
Epiplema quadristrigata 
Epiplema tenebrosa 
Europlema conchiferata 
Europlema desistaria 
Gathynia ferrugata 
Gathynia miraria 
Metorthocheilus emarginata 
Micronia aculeata 
Monobolodes prunaria 
Monobolodes parvinigrata 
Oroplema simplex 
Phazaca erosioides 
Phazaca leucocera 
Phazaca theclata 
Pseudomicronia advocataria 
Pseudomicronia fraterna 
Strophidia caudata 
Urapteroides astheniata

Urodidae - false burnet moths
Geoesthia ceylonica

Xyloryctidae - giant micromoths
Comocritis pieria 
Opisina arenosella

Yponomeutidae - ermine moths
Atteva fabriciella 
Pronomeuta sarcopis

Zygaenidae - burnet and forester moths

Callizygaena albipuncta 
Callizygaena auratus 
Cerodendra quadripunctata 
Chalcosia pretiosa 
Chalcosia venosa 
Cyclosia midamia 
Cyclosia panthona 
Eterusia aedea 
Heteropan scintillans 
Procotes diminuta 
Thyrassia subcordata 
Thyrassia virescens 
Trypanophora trapobanes

Gallery

See also
 List of butterflies of Sri Lanka
 George Hampson

References

Ades & Kendrick, 2004. Hong Kong Fauna. A Checklist of Selected Taxa. Kadoorie Farm & Botanic Garden Corp.
Arensberger, E. (2010). "Stichprobenartige Untersuchungen der Fauna Thailands (Lepidoptera: Pterophoridae)". Zeitschrift der Arbeitsgemeinschaft Österreichischer Entomologen (62):1-16. 
Bong-Kyu Byun, Sung-Soo Kim, Yang-Seop Bae, 2014. "Review of the Genus Nacoleia (Lepidoptera, Crambidae) from Korea, with Two Newly Recorded Species." Korean Journal of Applied Entomology. 53,1. pp. 81–84. 
De Prins, J. & De Prins, W. 2014. Global Taxonomic Database of Gracillariidae (Lepidoptera).
Diakonoff, A. (1982). "On a Collection of Some Families of Microlepidoptera from Sri Lanka (Ceylon)". Zoologische Verhandelingen. Rijksmuseum van Natuurlijke Historie Leiden
Fletcher, T.B., 1920. Life Histories of Indian Insects Microlepidoptera: I. Pterophoridae. Memoirs of the Department of Agriculture in India. Vol. VI (1):1-217.
Gielis, 2003. Review of the Pterophoridae from the Philippines. Zoologische Mededelingen Leiden 77.
Hampson, 1917. A Classification of the Pyralidae, subfamily Gallerianae. Novitates Zoologicae XXIV: 17-58
Inoue, 1967. Genus Nadagara from Japan and Taiwan (Lepidoptera: Geometridae). Pacific Insects 9 (1): 105-110
Lödl, 1998. Revision der Gattungen Acidon Hampson, 1896 und Hiaspis Walker, (1866) subfam.comb.n. (Lepidoptera. Noctuidae. Hypeninae). Quadrifina Band 1: 25-62 
Lödl & Gaal, 1998. Revision of the genus Anoratha Moore, 1867 (Lepidoptera: Noctuidae: Hypeninae). Quadrifina 1: 5-24
Meyrick, 1905, Descriptions of Indian Micro-Lepidoptera.I. - Journal of the Bombay Natural History Society 16(4):580–619.
Meyrick, 1911. Descriptions of Indian Micro-Lepidoptera. Part XIV. Journal of the Bombay Natural History Society. Vol.XXI: 104-131
Meyrick, 1913. Genera Insectorum. fasc. 165
Meyrick, 1916. Exotic Microlepidoptera. V.2
The Lepidoptera of Ceylon. By F. Moore
Rose & Pooni, 2004. Taxonomic Studies on the Superfamily Pterophoroidea (Lepidoptera) from Northwestern India. Zoos' Print Journal 20(3): 1787-1803

Schintlmeister, 2004. The Taxonomy of the genus Lymantria Hübner, (1819) (Lepidoptera: Lymantriidae). Quadrifina 7: 1-248
Shibuya, 1928. The systematic study on the Formosan Pyralidae. Journal of the Faculty of Agriculture of the Hokkaido Imperial University. Vol.22:1–300
Speidel & Mey, 1999. Catalogue of the Oriental Acentropinae (Lepidoptera, Crambidae). - Tijdschrift voor entomologie. 142:125-142.
Tharanga Aluthwattha, 2013. Family Saturniidae (Insecta: Lepidoptera) of Sri Lanka: An Overview. Journal of Tropiacal Asian Entomology 2 (1)1-11.
Tóth & Ronkay, 2015. Revision_of_the_Palaearctic_and_Oriental_species of the genus_Naarda Revision of the Palaearctic and Oriental species of the genus Naarda Walker, 1866 (Lepidoptera: Erebidae, Hypeninae). Part 5. Description of 13 new species from Asia
 Whalley, 1963. A revision of the world species of the genus Endotricha Zeller (Lepidoptera: Pyralidae). Bulletin of the British Museum (Natural History) (Entomology) 13 (11)
Wu & Park. Taxonomic review of the Lecithoceridae (Lepidoptera) in Sri Lanka IV. The subfamily Lecithocerinae: Genus Lecithocera Herrich-Schffer and its allies. Academia Sinica.
Wu & Park. Taxonomic Review of the Family Lecithoceridae (Lepidoptera) from Sri Lanka II. The Subfamily Torodorinae: Genera Deltoplastis Meyrick, Hygroplasta Meyrick, and Antiochtha Walker. Academia Sinica
Zaspel & Branham, 2008. World Checklist of Tribe Calpini (Lepidoptera: Noctuidae: Calpinae). Insecta Mundi. Paper 575.

External links

 Insects of Sri Lanka

 
Moths
Sri Lanka
Sri Lanka